Zemlja, meaning earth in Serbia-Croatian languages may refer to:

 Zemlja (feudal Balkans), a South Slavic feudal unit in the medieval Balkans
 Grega Žemlja (born 1986), Slovenian tennis player
 Grupa Zemlja or Earth Group, a Croatian arts collective 1929-1935

See also
 FK Crvena Zemlja, a football club from Republika Srpska, Bosnia and Herzegovina
 Zemlya (disambiguation)